Kara Mia is a 2019 Philippine television drama fantasy series broadcast by GMA Network. Directed by Dominic Zapata, it stars Barbie Forteza and Mika dela Cruz in the title role. It premiered on February 18, 2019 on the network's Telebabad line up replacing Cain at Abel. The series concluded on June 28, 2019 with a total of 92 episodes. It was replaced by Sahaya in its timeslot.

The series is originally titled as Ang Dalawang Mukha ni Guadalupe. It is streaming online on YouTube.

Premise
Kara and Mia are two faces in a single body, with Kara in the front and Mia in the back. When they get older, they will discover a way on how to separate their face with its own body every night, while going back to their original form at morning.

Cast and characters

Lead cast
 Barbie Forteza as Kara Machado Lacson
 Mika dela Cruz as Mia Machado Lacson

Supporting cast
 Jak Roberto as Bonifacio "Boni" Burgos
 Paul Salas as Chino Burgos
 Carmina Villarroel as Aya Machado-Lacson
 John Estrada as Arthur Lacson
 Glydel Mercado as Julia Garcia
 Mike Tan as Iswal / Wally
 Gina Pareño as Corazon
 Alicia Alonzo as Asuncion Machado
 Arthur Solinap as Alexandro "Lex" Lacson
 Liezel Lopez as Ellie Garcia
  as Estrella "Star" Machado Lacson
 April Gustilo as Betty Bahia
 Karenina Haniel as Lerma Jane "LJ" Cariño
 Cheska Iñigo as Madison
 Lui Manansala as Divina
 Madelaine Nicolas as Maria
 Mari Kaimo as Leon

Guest cast
 Rein Adriano as young Kara
 Sofia Catabay as young Mia
 Angelica Ulip as young Ellie
 Khaine Dela Cruz as young Chino
 Juan Miguel Tamayo as young Boni
 Sheen Infante as young Lerma
 Marx Topacio as Tobias
 Ai-Ai delas Alas as Reynarra
 Bembol Roco as Sio
 Rob Sy as Val
 Prince Clemente as an engkanto

Accolades

References

External links
 
 

2019 Philippine television series debuts
2019 Philippine television series endings
Fantaserye and telefantasya
Filipino-language television shows
GMA Network drama series
Television shows set in the Philippines